Nathalie Guerrée-Spitzer (born 7 July 1968) is a former professional tennis player from France.

Biography

Tennis career
Guerrée, a right-handed player, began competing on the WTA Tour in 1988. Her best performances on tour was a quarter-final appearance at the 1988 WTA Aix-en-Provence Open, which included a win over Nathalie Tauziat. She also won WTA Tour matches tour against Silvia Farina and Irina Spîrlea.

She first featured in the singles main draw of a grand slam at the 1988 French Open, where she lost to eventual champion Steffi Graf in the opening round. Over the next four year she competed in every edition of the tournament and twice reached the second round. In 1989 she competed in the main draws at the Australian Open and Wimbledon, making the third round of the former.

Personal life
Guerrée comes from the French region of Lorraine. She became Nathalie Guerrée-Spitzer after marriage and has four daughters.

ITF finals

Singles (0–2)

Doubles (0–1)

References

External links
 
 

1968 births
Living people
French female tennis players
Sportspeople from Metz